Pelling is a surname. Notable people with the surname include:

 Albert Pelling (1903–1977), British fencer
 Andrew Pelling (born 1959), British politician
 Christopher Pelling, British literary scholar
 Edward Pelling (baptised 1640–1718), English cleric and academic
 Henry Pelling (1920–1997), British historian
 John Pelling (disambiguation), multiple people
 Mark Pelling (born 1956), British circuit judge
 Maurice Pelling (1920–1973), British art director
 Nick Pelling (born 1964), British computer programmer and inventor
 Rowan Pelling (born 1968), British journalist